Nicholas Joseph Orville Liverpool (9 September 1934 – 1 June 2015) was a politician and jurist from Dominica who served as the sixth President of Dominica from 2 October 2003 to 17 September 2012.

Biography 
In 1957, Liverpool entered the University of Hull and obtained an LL.B (Hons.) degree in 1960. He was called to the bar at Inner Temple in 1961. He received a Ph.D degree from University of Sheffield in 1965. After returning to the Caribbean, he spent 18 years as a law lecturer at the University of the West Indies in Barbados and in 1992 became dean of its law school. He served as a regional judge and then an appeal court judge in several countries in the Caribbean including Belize and Grenada. He also served as a high court judge in Antigua and Montserrat and served on a number of tribunals and commissions for legal reform. In 2002 he was chairman of the constitutional review commission for Grenada. The University of Hull awarded him a degree of Doctor of Laws in July 2011.

Liverpool became Ambassador to the United States in March 1998, serving in that capacity until 2001.

In the same year as elected president, Liverpool was awarded the Dominica Award of Honour. Between 2002 and 2003 he also served as a Member of the UNESCO governing board. In July 2008 he agreed to serve a second term as President upon the expiration of his first term, following a joint nomination by Prime Minister Roosevelt Skerrit and Opposition Leader Earl Williams.

Nicholas Liverpool died on 1 June 2015 in Miami, Florida, where he was receiving medical treatment. He was 80 years old.

National honours
 Dominica Award of Honour

Foreign honours
 
  Two Sicilian Royal Family: Knight Grand Cross of the Two Sicilian Royal Sacred Military Constantinian Order of Saint George, Special Class

References

Note

External links
Official site of the President's Office, Commonwealth of Dominica

1934 births
2015 deaths
Alumni of the University of Hull
Alumni of the University of Sheffield
Ambassadors of Dominica to the United States
Dominica judges on the courts of Antigua and Barbuda
Dominica judges on the courts of Belize
Dominica judges on the courts of Grenada
Dominica judges on the courts of Montserrat
Dominica lawyers
People from Saint Patrick Parish, Dominica
Presidents of Dominica
Recipients of the Order of the Caribbean Community